The Best Day is the first compilation album by South Korean band Day6, released on June 6, 2018 through Warner Music Japan. It features all the title tracks released by the band from their debut extended play The Day to their second studio album Moonrise, the English versions of "Congratulations" and "You Were Beautiful" as well as the bilingual version of "I Wait".

Background and release
In April 2018, it was announced that Day6's first compilation album would be released on June 6.

Promotions
The band promoted the album as they held their first Japan solo concert entitled DAY6 1st LIVE in JAPAN “THE BEST DAY" on June 13–14, 2018, in Tokyo and Osaka. Both concerts were sold out.

Track listing

Editions
There are two versions of this album available: the Regular Edition and the Limited Edition.

 Regular Edition (WPCL-12883): This edition includes the CD only.
 Limited Edition (WPZL-31470): This edition comes with a DVD and a 40-page booklet.

Charts

Sales

References

2018 greatest hits albums
Day6 albums
Warner Music Japan albums
Korean-language albums